A light-harvesting complex consists of a number of chromophores which are complex subunit proteins that may be part of a larger super complex of a photosystem, the functional unit in photosynthesis. It is used by plants and photosynthetic bacteria to collect more of the incoming light than would be captured by the photosynthetic reaction center alone. The light which is captured by the chromophores is capable of exciting molecules from their ground state to a higher energy state, known as the excited state. This excited state does not last very long and is known to be short-lived.

Light-harvesting complexes are found in a wide variety among the different photosynthetic species, with no homology among the major groups. The complexes consist of proteins and photosynthetic pigments and surround a photosynthetic reaction center to focus energy, attained from photons absorbed by the pigment, toward the reaction center using Förster resonance energy transfer.

Function

Photosynthesis is a process where light is absorbed or harvested by pigment protein complexes which are able to turn sunlight into energy. Absorption of a photon by a molecule takes place when pigment protein complexes harvest sunlight leading to electronic excitation delivered to the reaction centre where the process of charge separation can take place. when the energy of the captured photon matches that of an electronic transition. The fate of such excitation can be a return to the ground state or another electronic state of the same molecule. When the excited molecule has a nearby neighbour molecule, the excitation energy may also be transferred, through electromagnetic interactions, from one molecule to another. This process is called resonance energy transfer, and the rate depends strongly on the distance between the energy donor and energy acceptor molecules. Before an excited photon can transition back to ground state, the energy needs to be harvested. This excitation is transferred among chromophores where it is delivered to the reaction centre. Light-harvesting complexes have their pigments specifically positioned to optimize these rates.

In purple bacteria

Purple bacteria is a type of photosynthetic organism with a light harvesting complex consisting of two pigment protein complexes referred to as LH1 and LH2. Within the photosynthetic membrane, these two complexes differ in terms of their arrangement. The LH1 complexes surrounds the reaction centre, while the LH2 complexes are arranged around the LH1 complexes and the reaction centre in a peripheral fashion. Purple bacteria use bacteriochlorophyll and carotenoids to gather light energy. These proteins are arranged in a ring-like fashion creating a cylinder that spans the membrane.

In green bacteria

The main light harvesting complex in Green bacteria is known as the chlorosome. The chlorosome is equipped with rod-like BChl c aggregates with protein embedded lipids surrounding it. Chlorosomes are found outside of the membrane which covers the reaction centre. Green sulphur bacteria and some Chloroflexia use ellipsoidal complexes known as the chlorosome to capture light. Their form of bacteriochlorophyll is green.

In cyanobacteria and plants

Chlorophylls and carotenoids are important in light-harvesting complexes present in plants. Chlorophyll b is almost identical to chlorophyll a, except it has a formyl group in place of a methyl group. This small difference makes chlorophyll b absorb light with wavelengths between 400 and 500 nm more efficiently. Carotenoids are long linear organic molecules that have alternating single and double bonds along their length. Such molecules are called polyenes. Two examples of carotenoids are lycopene and β-carotene. These molecules also absorb light most efficiently in the 400 – 500 nm range.
Due to their absorption region, carotenoids appear red and yellow and provide most of the red and yellow colours present in fruits and flowers.

The carotenoid molecules also serve a safeguarding function. Carotenoid molecules suppress damaging photochemical reactions, in particular those including oxygen, which exposure to sunlight can cause. Plants that lack carotenoid molecules quickly die upon exposure to oxygen and light.

Phycobilisome

The antenna-shaped light harvesting complex of cyanobacteria, glaucocystophyta, and red algae is known as the phycobilisome which is composed of linear tetrapyrrole pigments. Pigment-protein complexes referred to as R-phycoerythrin are rod-like in shape and make up the rods and core of the phycobilisome. Little light reaches algae that reside at a depth of one meter or more in seawater, as light is absorbed by seawater. The pigments, such as phycocyanobilin and phycoerythrobilin, are the chromophores that bind through a covalent thioether bond to their apoproteins at cysteins residues. The apoprotein with its chromophore is called phycocyanin, phycoerythrin, and allophycocyanin, respectively. They often occur as hexamers of α and β subunits (α3β3)2. They enhance the amount and spectral window of light absorption and fill the "green gap", which occur in higher Plants.

The geometrical arrangement of a phycobilisome is very elegant and results in 95% efficiency of energy transfer. There is a central core of allophycocyanin, which sits above a photosynthetic reaction center. There are phycocyanin and phycoerythrin subunits that radiate out from this center like thin tubes. This increases the surface area of the absorbing section and helps focus and concentrate light energy down into the reaction center to a Chlorophyll. The energy transfer from excited electrons absorbed by pigments in the phycoerythrin subunits at the periphery of these antennas appears at the reaction center in less than 100 ps.

See also
 Photosynthesis
 Photosynthetic reaction center
 Photosystem II light-harvesting protein
 Light harvesting pigment

References

Further reading
 Caffarri (2009)Functional architecture of higher plantphotosystem II supercomplexes. The EMBO Journal 28: 3052–3063
 Govindjee & Shevela (2011) Adventures with cyanobacteria: a personal perspective. Frontiers in Plant Science.
 Liu et al. (2004) Crystal structure of spinach major light-harvesting complex at 2.72A° resolution. Nature 428: 287–292.
 Lokstein (1994)The role of light-harvesting complex II energy dissipation: an in-vivo fluorescence in excess excitation study on the origin of high-energy quenching. Journal of Photochemistry and Photobiology 26: 175-184
 MacColl (1998) Cyanobacterial Phycobilisomes. JOURNAL OF STRUCTURAL BIOLOGY 124(2-3): 311-34.

External links
 
 Photosynthesis and all sub categories

Photosynthesis
Transmembrane proteins